Jennifer Frances Lamy (born 28 February 1949) is a former Australian sprinter.

Lamy's international debut came at the 1966 British Empire and Commonwealth Games in Kingston, Jamaica, where she won a silver medal in the 220 yards race behind countrywoman Dianne Burge and shared in a sprint relay gold medal.

Still a junior at the 1968 Summer Olympics in Mexico City she won a bronze medal in 200 metres behind the Polish gold medalist Irena Szewińska and another Australian, Raelene Boyle.

Lamy went on to compete in two further Commonwealth Games, winning gold-medals on each occasion as part of the Australian 4 × 100 metres relay teams.

In her career, she won three Australian national championships: the 200 m in 1967 and the 100 m/200 m sprint double in 1969.

She received an Australian Sports Medal in 2000 and was inducted into the Athletics Australia Hall of Fame in 2014.

References

External links
 
 
 
 

1949 births
Living people
Australian people of French descent
Australian female sprinters
Athletes (track and field) at the 1968 Summer Olympics
Olympic athletes of Australia
Olympic bronze medalists for Australia
Athletes (track and field) at the 1966 British Empire and Commonwealth Games
Athletes (track and field) at the 1970 British Commonwealth Games
Athletes (track and field) at the 1974 British Commonwealth Games
Commonwealth Games gold medallists for Australia
Commonwealth Games silver medallists for Australia
Commonwealth Games medallists in athletics
Recipients of the Australian Sports Medal
Medalists at the 1968 Summer Olympics
Olympic bronze medalists in athletics (track and field)
Olympic female sprinters
Medallists at the 1966 British Empire and Commonwealth Games
Medallists at the 1970 British Commonwealth Games
Medallists at the 1974 British Commonwealth Games